Groenvlei is a town in Emadlangeni Local Municipality in the KwaZulu-Natal province of South Africa.

References

Populated places in the eMadlangeni Local Municipality